Crewe Diesel Depot is a former diesel-electric locomotive traction maintenance depot, formerly Crewe Diesel Traction Maintenance Depot or Crewe Diesel TMD, situated to the south of and visible from Crewe railway station. Built in 1958 by British Railways it was used as a maintenance facility for the diesel locomotives that were at the time replacing steam traction across the national rail network. Following the privatisation of British Rail depot ownership transferred to EWS, now DB Schenker and continued as a base for diesel traction, latterly becoming a facility for storing surplus rolling stock. In 2014 ownership transferred to Locomotive Storage Limited who have been and are continuing to renovate the site.

British Railways
Constructed in 1957 and opened the following year, the site was built to maintain the growing fleet of British Railways diesel locomotives and multiple units used on the Midland region.

Oil-fired boilers heated the offices, messroom, locker room and toilets, designed to accommodate up to 100, with a maximum of 80 at any one time. A  fuel tank supplied three fuelling points. The depot had a 2-ton electric hoist block for unloading stores from wagons and a trichloroethylene degreasing machine.

Privatisation
Following privatisation the depot passed into the hands of EWS who continued to use the site for the assessment, maintenance, repairing, storing and scrapping of diesel-electric locomotives.

Throughout the late 2000s and early 2010s the site fell into an increasing state of disrepair, being used for the long-term storage of DB Schenker locomotives. The site was also extensively used by Riviera Trains for the storage of rolling stock.

Current Ownership
In early 2014 the lease was signed for Locomotive Storage to operate and develop the facility. This included the 12 outside roads - one of which is electrified - 8 internal roads and the depot building itself, along with the dedicated paint shop and heavy lift building.

Since the transfer of ownership, the site has been extensively renovated. The main building has seen the complete renewal of its roof along with internal refitting that has included the complete renovation of the living and office areas, allowing the site to become home to both Locomotive Storage Limited and LNWR Heritage's offices.

The internal layout of the building has been modified, with the installation of a partition protecting three of the internal roads from dirt and dust from the workshop areas. 5 ton cranes have been installed along with heavy lifting jacks, to expand the maintenance and overhaul capabilities of the site.

LNWR Heritage
LNWR Heritage a heritage rail restoration company owned by the Royal Scot Locomotive and General Trust moved to the site in early 2015, transferring much of their operation from their former base north of the railway station at Crewe Heritage Centre.

Leasing several of the roads inside the main building, LNWR Heritage can make use of 5 and 45 ton cranes, heavy lifting jacks, pit roads and dedicated workshop and paint shop facilities, aimed at providing a permanent base for their heritage rail engineering work for many years to come.

Future

It is planned that further developments on the site will include the construction of a dedicated boilershop, to be used by LNWR Heritage, for the overhaul of steam locomotive boilers. Locomotive Storage Ltd will also oversee the construction of a two road, roughly 250m long shed to allow the under-cover storage of carriages and other vehicles at the site.

These developments will likely see changes to the current track layout at the site.

References

 Rail Atlas Great Britain & Ireland, S.K. Baker

Further reading

External links

An overhead view of the depot. The West Coast Main Line is to the immediate east. The freight line is to the immediate west.

Railway depots in England
Rail transport in Cheshire